Saint John's Church is a church building in Habo in Sweden. Belonging to the Habo Parish of the Church of Sweden, it was inaugurated on 12 September 1993.

References

External links

20th-century Church of Sweden church buildings
Churches in Habo Municipality
Churches completed in 1993
Habo
Churches in the Diocese of Skara